Elisabeth Hermine Abegg, known as Lily Abegg (7 December 1901 – 13 July 1974) was a Swiss journalist.

Abegg grew up in Yokohama, Japan, where her father traded in silk. She studied political science in Geneva, Hamburg and Heidelberg, graduating with a doctorate.

From 1934 to 40 she was the East Asia correspondent of the Frankfurter Allgemeine Zeitung (FAZ) in Tokyo, and in 1939 she reported about the Second Sino-Japanese War from China. After returning to Switzerland, she wrote for the Weltwoche, reporting from the Middle East and South East Asia, but returned to her post as FAZ East Asia correspondent from 1954 to 64. After she returned to Switzerland again in 1964, she served as Asia advisor to the FAZ.

With her several books about the society and politics of China and Japan, as well as her articles, Abegg helped to broaden popular knowledge about these countries in the German-speaking world.

References

20th-century Swiss women writers
Swiss women journalists
1901 births
1974 deaths
20th-century Swiss journalists
People from Yokohama
Women war correspondents
Swiss expatriates in Japan